Futebol Clube do Porto B, commonly known as Porto B, is a Portuguese professional football team, which serves as the reserve side of FC Porto. They compete in the Liga Portugal 2, the second division of Portuguese football, and play their home matches at the Estádio Municipal Jorge Sampaio in Pedroso, Vila Nova de Gaia.

Domestically, Porto B were the first and currently, the only Portuguese reserve side to have won the second division title after a successful campaign in the 2015–16 season. Internationally, the team is the record holder of the Premier League International Cup after two consecutive wins in the 2016–17 and 2017–18 editions.

As a reserve team, the squad cannot compete in the same division as their senior team, thus being ineligible for promotion to the Primeira Liga. In addition, they can't participate in other domestic cup competitions such as the Taça de Portugal and Taça da Liga.

History

Revival
Prior to the end of the 2011–12 season, seven Primeira Liga clubs announced their interest in creating a B team to fill the six vacancies available in for the 2012–13 Segunda Liga season. Six of these clubs were selected to have their B teams take part in the competition: Benfica, Braga, Marítimo, Porto, Sporting CP, and Vitória de Guimarães.

The LPFP, which governs professional football in Portugal, announced that for B teams to compete in the 2012–13 Segunda Liga they would have to pay a fee of €50,000. In addition, the LPFP would also require teams to follow new rules regarding player selection, such as having a minimum of ten players formed at the club's academy and with an age requirement of 15–21 years old, with a maximum of three players above 23 years old allowed. The LPFP also decided that B teams were ineligible to compete in cup competitions, as well as gaining promotion to the Primeira Liga due to the possibility of playing against the senior team.

In late May 2012, it was officially announced that the B teams of six Primeira Liga clubs would compete in the 2012–13 Segunda Liga. This decision resulted in an expansion of the number of teams from 16 to 22, and the number of matches from 30 to 42.

In 2013–14 the side, led for most of the season by Luís Castro, finished as runners-up but were ineligible for promotion. Two years later, with Castro back in charge and André Silva scoring 14 times, the team won the league by five points.

Players

Current squad
.

Seasons and managers statistics

League performance record
Information correct as of end of the 2020–21 season. Only competitive league matches are counted.

Managerial statistics
Information correct as of the match played on 22 May 2021. Only competitive matches are counted.

Honours

Domestic
Segunda Liga
Winners (1): 2015–16
Runners-up (1): 2013–14

European
Premier League International Cup
Winners (2): 2016–17, 2017–18
Runners-up (1): 2014–15

Others
VFF Cup
Winners (1): 2004

References

External links
Official club website 
Club Profile at LPFP 

 
Association football clubs established in 1999
Association football clubs disestablished in 2006
Football clubs in Portugal
Portuguese reserve football teams
1999 establishments in Portugal
2006 disestablishments in Portugal
Liga Portugal 2 clubs
Premier League International Cup
2012 establishments in Portugal
Association football clubs established in 2012
FC Porto